The Coronet was a three-wheeled microcar with a rear-mounted  Excelsior two-cylinder, two-stroke  engine.

References

External links
 1958 Coronet on display at the Lane Motor Museum

Car manufacturers of the United Kingdom
Microcars
Defunct motor vehicle manufacturers of England
Three-wheeled motor vehicles
Cars introduced in 1957